The siege of Aleppo in April 1138 was a significant attempt to capture the city by the allied forces of the Byzantines and the Franks.

The Byzantine Emperor John II Komnenos allied with the Franks in an attempt to capture Aleppo. The Christian army was largely composed of Byzantine regulars and also included a Templar force and substantial contingents from Antioch and Edessa. As the Christian army approached Aleppo its inhabitants withdrew into the outlying garrisons and sent word to Zengi, asking him for help. Zengi rushed to obtain reinforcements before the arrival of the allied army, he received a reinforcement of cavalry, infantry and specialist archers just in time.

The Byzantines were aware of the strategic importance of Aleppo and one of the objectives of their Syrian campaign was to create a Christian buffer state centred on Aleppo but also including Shaizar, Homs and Hama. Due to the dangers involved the Byzantines were content to let the Franks own the buffer state of the hinterlands, presumably under imperial suzerainty.

The Byzantines were camped on River Quwaiq and launched attacks on the south and west of Aleppo on April 19 in an attempt to size out the strength of the garrison and intimidate them with the size and aggression of the besieging force. Instead the reverse happened, large numbers of the Muslim militia made a sortie against the Byzantines and emerged victorious from the skirmishing. One of the senior Byzantine commanders was wounded during the fight. Following their defeat, the Byzantines departed in search of easier pickings. After Zengi had routed the Christian army he took possession of Atharib.

References

Conflicts in 1138
1130s in the Byzantine Empire
History of Aleppo
 Battles involving the Zengid dynasty
Battles involving the Seljuk Empire
Sieges involving the Byzantine Empire
Battles involving the Knights Templar
Battles involving the Principality of Antioch
John II Komnenos